BNT 3 (previously BNT HD)  is a Bulgarian-language public television station, operated by the Bulgarian National Television. It broadcasts sport events, movies and cultural programs.

History
It was launched on February 6, 2014 as "BNT HD", with the start of the Sochi 2014 Olympic Games. Beforehand BNT used to air sports events such as the 2010 FIFA World Cup and the London 2012 Olympics in HD on temporary HD channels which used to upscale the BNT 1 channel. In 2014 the national television decided to launch BNT HD as a fully scheduled channel. On 10 September 2018 the channel was re-branded as BNT 3. BNT 3 airs free-to-air on the Bulgarian DVB-T platform.

Former logos

Television networks in Bulgaria
Bulgarian-language television stations
Television channels and stations established in 2014
